Studio 23 (officially Studio 23, Inc. and previously AMCARA Broadcasting Network) was a Filipino television network owned by ABS-CBN Corporation. The network was named for its flagship station in Metro Manila, DWAC-TV and carried on UHF channel 23. The network was a sister network of the main channel, ABS-CBN, airing programming aimed towards young adults, such as North American imports and other English-language programming, and original Tagalog programming aimed at the demographic as well, such as supplemental programming for ABS-CBN programs. This station studios were located at 3/F ABS-CBN Broadcast Center, Sgt. Esguerra Ave., Mother Ignacia St., Diliman, Quezon City.

History

At a planning session during the mid-1990s, ABS-CBN staff members were plotting out plans for a new UHF channel offering a more "upscale" alternative to the main ABS-CBN. In the lead-up to the launch, ABS-CBN acquired the rights to many syndicated U.S. imports, such as Wheel of Fortune and The Oprah Winfrey Show.

The flagship station, DWAC-TV owned by the AMCARA Broadcasting Network, signed on about a month before the launch of Studio 23, simulcasting MTV Asia.

Studio 23 was officially launched on October 12, 1996, but as a timeshare with MTV Asia aired during the daytime, with Studio 23 programming taking over in the primetime hours. The first program aired on launch night was the movie The Bodyguard. Two days later, News 23 premiered, Studio 23's news program produced by ABS-CBN News and Current Affairs. Studio 23 also became the first UHF television network to broadcast in full surround stereo. On January 1, 2001, ABS-CBN severed their ties with MTV Asia, and Studio 23 gained total control of DWAC-TV. MTV moved to DZRU-TV after the change and relaunched as MTV Philippines and ABS-CBN launched their own music channel, Myx. Also that day, it launched a new slogan, "Cool TV". On February 22, 2003, Studio 23 simulcasted with ABS-CBN Channel 2 for four months.

Studio 23's programming evolved from being "upscale" (as suggested by their previous slogan as the "Premium Network") to a young adult demographic. The network aired a multitude of US imports, but also aired original programming, such as spinoffs and supplemental programming for shows aired on the main ABS-CBN network, such as Pinoy Dream Academy and Pinoy Big Brother. The network won numerous awards from various groups, such as a silver medal in the Print category at the 2006 Promax Awards. Its flagship program, the talk show Y Speak, also won numerous awards and accolades. In 2010, The network was reformatted from English back to Taglish, first adopted in 2004.

Studio 23 has announced, on its 17-year broadcast, that it has ceased its commercial operations on the night of Thursday, January 16, 2014, right after its final programs Myx and O Shopping, a video presentation was shown. At the end of it, the station thanked its viewers for the past 17 years on-air. The station officially closed down at around 2am. The following day, an unnamed station aired and used the words "Test Broadcast" on the supposed position of the Studio 23 logo. On the same day, teasers began showing for the replacement channel. Studio 23 was replaced by ABS-CBN's free TV sports channel, S+A (programming would be 70% sporting events and 30% movies/entertainment/newscast) effective January 18, 2014.

Programs

References

External links 
 
 

 
Defunct television networks in the Philippines
Television channels and stations established in 1996
Television channels and stations disestablished in 2014
1996 establishments in the Philippines
2014 disestablishments in the Philippines
ABS-CBN Corporation channels